Blanche Hinman Dow (February 9, 1894, Louisiana, Missouri-May 25, 1973) was President of the American Association of University Women (1963-1967) and was President of Cottey College, retiring in 1965 after serving for 16 years.

Dow graduated from Smith College in 1913, continuing her education at Columbia University earning a master's degree and doctorate in French. She went on to serve on the White House Commission on International Cooperation, the National Citizens Committee on Community Relations, and the President's Committee on Employment of the Handicapped.

Works
The Changing Attitude Toward Women in Fifteenth‐Century French Literature (1936)
Meditations for Women (1949)

Legacy
The Dow International Scholarship Fund at Cottey College was established in 1973 in memory of Dow and provides funding for international students.

References

Cottey College
Presidents of the American Association of University Women
Smith College alumni
Columbia University alumni
1894 births
1973 deaths
People from Louisiana, Missouri
Place of death missing
Heads of universities and colleges in the United States
20th-century American academics